Luna di miele in tre (Honeymoon in three) is a  1976 Italian comedy film. It  marked the directorial debut of Carlo Vanzina.

Plot 
On the eve of his wedding trip (destination Sanremo) Alfredo Riva learns that he had won a contest of "Playmen" whose prize is a five-day vacation in Jamaica together, day and night, with the beautiful playmate Christine. Reached the Caribbean island with the unsuspecting wife Graziella, Alfredo has to use a series of subterfuges of which will end up making expenses.

Cast 
 Renato Pozzetto: Alfredo Riva
 Stefania Casini: Graziella Luraghi
 Vincent Gardenia: Frank
 Kirsten Gille: Christine/Rebecca
 Harry Reems: Gilbert Blain
 Cochi Ponzoni: Aldo Santarelli
 Felice Andreasi: Hotel Director
 Massimo Boldi: Adamo

See also    
 List of Italian films of 1976

References

External links

1976 films
Italian comedy films
1976 comedy films
Films directed by Carlo Vanzina
Films scored by Armando Trovajoli
Films set in the Caribbean
1976 directorial debut films
1970s Italian-language films
1970s Italian films